Charles Rice McDowell Jr. (June 24, 1926 – November 5, 2010) was a long-time political writer and nationally syndicated columnist for the Richmond Times-Dispatch and panelist on PBS-TV's Washington Week in Review.  McDowell appeared in an interview in Ken Burns' documentary The Congress; provided the character voice for Sam R. Watkins in Burns' documentary The Civil War; and provided character voice as well as consultation for Burns' documentary Baseball.  McDowell was a Washington and Lee University alumnus and a member of Columbia's Graduate School of Journalism.

Life 
McDowell was born in Danville, Kentucky, on June 24, 1926. He was the son of Charles Rice McDowell Sr. and Catherine Frazier Feland. When he was young, the family moved to Lexington, Virginia, where the elder McDowell was a professor of law at Washington and Lee University. (His mother was the long-time secretary to the law dean; eventually, she was said to wield so much power that she effectively "was the dean of law.") The younger McDowell became an undergraduate there, majoring in English and graduating in 1948. He also graduated from the Columbia University School of Journalism.

McDowell then moved to Richmond, Virginia, and joined the staff of the Richmond Times-Dispatch, where he would remain his entire career, retiring in 1998. He covered local news and was then assigned to the State Capitol, where he reported on the General Assembly and state politics. In 1954, McDowell began to write a syndicated column that appeared three or four times per week and would span the remainder of his career. He was assigned to Washington, D.C., in 1965, and relocated to Alexandria. McDowell wrote three books: Campaign Fever, a journal of the 1964 presidential election; and two collections of humor columns, One Thing After Another (1960) and What Did You Have in Mind? (1963). He was also a panelist on PBS' "Washington Week in Review" for 18 years, beginning in 1978, and was a writer, narrator and host for other PBS programs, including "Summer of Judgment: The Watergate Hearings," "Richmond Memories" and "For the Record." McDowell also provided voice-overs for the productions The Civil War and Baseball by Ken Burns.

McDowell was inducted into the Virginia Communications Hall of Fame in 1988, and awarded the Fourth Estate Award by the National Press Club in 1996. He married Ann G. Webb of Ashland, Virginia. McDowell lived with his wife in Alexandria, Virginia, until they moved to Virginia Beach after his retirement. He died on November 5, 2010, at age 84, due to complications of a stroke, and is buried at Oak Grove Cemetery (Lexington, Virginia) in Lexington, Virginia.

References

External links

Writers from Danville, Kentucky
Writers from Richmond, Virginia
Writers from Alexandria, Virginia
Washington and Lee University alumni
Columbia University Graduate School of Journalism alumni
American male journalists
1926 births
2010 deaths
American television journalists